"What's Up?" is a song by American rock group 4 Non Blondes, released in June 1993 as the second single from their debut album, Bigger, Better, Faster, More! (1992). It has gained popularity in the United States and in several European countries, peaking at number one in Austria, Belgium, Denmark, Germany, Iceland, Ireland, the Netherlands, Norway, Poland, Sweden, and Switzerland. The accompanying music video was directed by American film director Morgan Lawley and was also nominated in the category for Best Alternative Rock Video at the MTV Video Music Awards.

Background and writing
The song had its origins well before 4 Non Blondes were formed. During the time when the two were struggling musicians in San Francisco, Third Eye Blind frontman Stephan Jenkins recalled sitting in a room with Linda Perry, who worked as a waitress down the street, performing their original compositions to one another. The two played each other early versions of "Semi-Charmed Life" and "What's Up?", both of which would become massive hits for their respective bands. It would be decades later that Jenkins realized the songs performed in that private session would sell a combined 17 million records. 

The title does not appear in the song's lyrics, but the phrase "what's going on?" is prominently included in the chorus. Perry told Rolling Stone that she heavily disliked the song's production. Perry revealed on Behind the Music that she hated David Tickle's reworked version (with different lyrics) intended to be used for their album. She had told this to Jimmy Iovine, who agreed, preferring Perry's demo version over Tickle's. Tickle's instrumental (over the original vocals) could be heard on Perry's episode of Behind the Music; Tickle's version was never released. The final version was recorded in one day after Iovine allowed 4 Non Blondes to re-record Perry's demo version. The music video was directed by Morgan Lawley. During an interview with Tape Op magazine, Perry said:

"The producer (David Tickle) had no sense of what the song was. I went to the label and said 'This song sucks. This is not the song I wrote.' I grabbed the band during a break and we went to The Record Plant in Sausalito. I started moving things around. I was in the middle of vocals when David Tickle showed up. I was annoyed...we were already done with the frigging song. We comped the vocal and mixed it that night.... That is the version that blew up all over the world. I've told the story enough that people know that David Tickle did not produce that song. It was me."

Critical reception
AllMusic editor Tom Demalon described the song as a "massive, neo-hippie anthem" in his review of Bigger, Better, Faster, More! Rolf Edmund Lund from Norwegian Altaposten complimented Perry's voice as "incredibly good". Larry Flick from Billboard wrote that "gymnastic vocals, leaping from a breathy, high range, to gravelly, bar-rock blues in a single passage, front this straightforward, heartfelt rocker. Treads the line between album rock and modern rock, with the piano version favoring the former." Tom Sinclair from Entertainment Weekly described it as "funky" and added that it "is only one of the goodies in the Blondes' musical grab bag". James Masterton viewed it as "a wonderful piece of laid back summer rock (well, almost)". Pan-European magazine Music & Media complimented it as a "strong composition", where the lyrics "are done more than justice by Linda Perry's impressive vocal touch." A reviewer commented, "Toni Childs backed by a rock band playing Bobbie McFerrin's "Don't Worry, Be Happy" comes closest as a description." 

Alan Jones from Music Week felt it is "charming" and "easily the best track" of the album. R.S. Murthi from New Straits Times called it "anthemic" and remarked that it "is probably one of the simplest and catchiest pop songs to be produced in recent times." Carmen von Rohr from Rome News-Tribune noted "the amazingly down-to earth common sense lyrics" of "What's Up?", and added that Linda Perry "sings in her rich, soulful voice about the frustrations she feels as she tries to adjust to her place in the universe." A reviewer from Sunday Life wrote that the song is "naggingly memorable". Ronny Johansen from Troms Folkeblad commented, "What a wonderful use of voice and what an irresistible song!"

Chart performance
The recording received considerable airplay success. It reached number 14 on the US Billboard Hot 100 and went gold, but peaked higher in many other countries, reaching number one in Austria, Belgium, Denmark, Germany, Iceland, Ireland, the Netherlands, Norway, Sweden, and Switzerland while reaching number two in the United Kingdom and Australia.

Impact and legacy
"What's Up?" was ranked number 94 on VH1's "100 Greatest One-Hit Wonders" and number 86 on the MuchMore "The Top 100 One Hit Wonders".

Some critics disliked "What's Up?" Songwriters Carl Barât and Stuart Braithwaite named the song the worst ever. Dean Ween said: "It's as bad as music gets…. Everything about the song is so awful that if I sat down and tried to write the worst song ever, I couldn't even make it 10 percent of the reality of how awful that song is." Tara Dublin in The Huffington Post wrote that it is "without question, the worst song of the 1990s".

In 2019, About.com featured it in their ranking of "The Best 100 Songs From the 1990s". Bill Lamb remarked that the song "seemingly appeared out of nowhere, becoming a neo-folkie hit first on modern rock radio stations and then on the pop charts. Although it only reached number 11, it has been a radio fixture ever since."

Music video
A music video was produced to promote the single. It was directed by American film director Morgan Lawley and features the band, dressed in punk clothing, performing the song as they stand in a living room set decorated with paintings. In between, there is footage of the band in a park and a playground. It was nominated in the category for Best Alternative Rock Video at the MTV Video Music Awards. The video was later published on YouTube in February 2011. It had generated more than 1 billion views as of September 2021.

Track listings

 US and Australian cassette single
 "What's Up?" (LP version)
 "Train" (LP version)

 European 7-inch and cassette single
 "What's Up?"
 "What's Up?" (piano version)

 European and Australian CD single
 "What's Up?" (edit) – 4:16
 "What's Up?" (remix) – 4:51
 "Train" – 3:47
 "What's Up?" (piano version) – 4:09

Credits and personnel
Credits are lifted from the Bigger, Better, Faster, More! album booklet.

Studios
 Recorded at The Plant (Sausalito, California)
 Mixed and overdubbed at The Bunker (Malibu, California)
 Mastered at Precision Mastering (Los Angeles)

4 Non Blondes
 Linda Perry – writing, vocals, acoustic and electric guitar
 Roger Rocha – guitar
 Christa Hillhouse – bass, vocals
 Dawn Richardson – drums

Other personnel
 David Tickle – production, recording, mixing
 Mark Hensley – engineering
 Stephen Marcussen – mastering

Charts

Weekly charts

Year-end charts

Decade-end charts

Certifications

DJ Miko version

Italian disc jockey DJ Miko covered the song as a dance track in 1993 (retitled without the question mark) with vocals provided by British singer Louise Gard. Although the song was released as a stand-alone single, it later appeared on DJ Miko's sole album, The Last Millennium, in 1999. DJ Miko's version was a modest hit in Europe in late 1993 and early 1994, reaching number five in Italy and Spain, number 13 in Finland, and number 17 in Sweden.

The cover was released worldwide in mid-1994, peaking at number six on the UK Singles Chart and number eight on the Irish Singles Chart. On the Eurochart Hot 100, "What's Up" reached number 21. In the United States it reached number 58 on the Billboard Hot 100 chart and number 19 on the Billboard Dance Club Songs chart. In the Australasia region, "What's Up" was popular in New Zealand, reaching number 23 on the RIANZ Singles Chart, but it was a commercial failure in Australia, reaching number 92 on the ARIA Singles Chart.

Critical reception
James Masterton wrote in his weekly UK chart commentary, "The biggest new hit of the week comes straight from the clubs. After setting dancefloors alight for weeks, this rather pointless dance remake of the 4 Non Blondes track crashes straight into the Top 10. As a dance track it seems to work alright but of course pales in comparison with the original which made No.2 in July last year." James Hamilton from British magazine Music Week'''s RM Dance Update described the song as a "truly bizarre galloping cheesy Eurodisco remake of the 4 Non Blonde's strangulatedly wailed 1993 smash".

Charts

Weekly charts

Year-end charts

Minnesota version

German Eurodance group Minnesota covered the song as a dance version in late 1993. It reached number one in Portugal and on the Canadian RPM Dance chart, peaked at number two in Finland, and also charted in Belgium and Switzerland.

Charts

Weekly charts

Year-end charts

In popular culture
In 2005, a Texas-based animation and video production company known as SLACKCiRCUS created a satirical music video titled "Fabulous Secret Powers." Edited by Ryan Haines and composed by Jay Allen, the video was inspired by Fenslerfilm's G.I. Joe PSAs and pairs/edits footage from He-Man and the Masters of the Universe with their own techno-house cover of "What's Up" (which eventually interpolates "Don't Cry Out Loud" by Melissa Manchester). It has since become an internet meme, with a shortened version (titled "HEYYEYAAEYAAAEYAEYAA") amassing over 206 million views on YouTube .

In 2015, it appeared in the fourth episode, "What's Going On?", of the Netflix Original series Sense8''; in the episode, whose title quotes the song's refrain, the song establishes the growing psychic connection between the main characters through a shared karaoke performance.

In 2022, the song appeared in the fourth episode the Hulu miniseries, Pam & Tommy.

References

1993 singles
4 Non Blondes songs
Atlantic Records singles
Dutch Top 40 number-one singles
European Hot 100 Singles number-one singles
Internet memes introduced in 2005
Interscope Records singles
Irish Singles Chart number-one singles
LGBT-related songs
Number-one singles in Austria
Number-one singles in Belgium
Number-one singles in Denmark
Number-one singles in Germany
Number-one singles in Iceland
Number-one singles in Norway
Number-one singles in Portugal
Number-one singles in Sweden
Number-one singles in Switzerland
Songs written by Linda Perry